Joseilson Batista dos Santos (born 24 September 1984), known as Josa, is a Brazilian footballer who plays for Castanhal as an midfielder

Career statistics

References

External links

Profile at Foradejogo.net

1984 births
Living people
Brazilian footballers
Association football midfielders
Campeonato Brasileiro Série B players
Campeonato Brasileiro Série C players
Campeonato Brasileiro Série D players
Ituano FC players
Figueirense FC players
Salgueiro Atlético Clube players
Clube Náutico Capibaribe players
Cuiabá Esporte Clube players
Esporte Clube Vitória players
Boa Esporte Clube players
Clube de Regatas Brasil players
Mogi Mirim Esporte Clube players
Esporte Clube Jacuipense players
Central Sport Club players
C.D. Santa Clara players
F.C. Paços de Ferreira players
Brazilian expatriate footballers
Expatriate footballers in Portugal